Sutorina is a village and a river located in Herceg Novi Municipality in southwestern Montenegro.

The village is located near the border with Croatia, some three kilometers northwest of the Adriatic Sea in Igalo.

The surrounding region, including a short stretch of the Adriatic coast, was named after the little vale of the river Sutorina west of Herceg Novi.

History

Sutorina was part of Bosnia and Herzegovina within Austria-Hungary and Yugoslavia between 1878 and 1947 when it became part of SR Montenegro. Circumstances of this transfer are under long dispute, see Sutorina dispute. On 26 August 2015, governments of Bosnia and Herzegovina and Montenegro signed in Vienna a border agreement which gave sovereignty over Sutorina to Montenegro.

Demographics
According to the 2011 census, its population was 670.

Sports
The local football club is FK Obilić Herceg Novi, who play in the country's third tier. FK Boka Metal Sutorina, who used to play in the same league, currently only play in youth football.

See also
Railway Čapljina - Zelenika 
Dračevica (župa)

References

External links

Bosnia and Herzegovina–Montenegro border
Populated places in Herceg Novi Municipality
Serb communities in Montenegro